Victorian Studies is a quarterly peer-reviewed academic journal published by Indiana University Press. It covers research on nineteenth-century Britain during the reign of Queen Victoria (1837–1901) and publishes essays, forums, and reviews on a variety of topics concerning Victorianism, including literature, social and political history, philosophy, fine arts, science, economics, and law. It is the official journal of the North American Victorian Studies Association.

Victorian Studies was established in 1956 at Indiana University by Philip Appleman, William A. Madden, and Michael Wolff. The journal is hosted by the university's Victorian Studies Program, in conjunction with the English department. The current editors-in-chief are Ivan Kreilkamp, Rae Greiner, Monique Morgan, and Lara Kriegel.

Recent issues of the journal have focused on a variety of topics, ranging from science, including "Darwin and the Evolution of Victorian Studies", to the more subjective sphere of "Victorian Emotions".

Abstracting and indexing 
The journal is abstracted and indexed in MLA Bibliography, Arts and Humanities Citation Index, Current Contents/Arts & Humanities, Social Sciences Citation Index, ProQuest, and EBSCO databases.

References

External links 
 

Victorian era
Multidisciplinary humanities journals
Quarterly journals
Publications established in 1956
Indiana University Press academic journals
English-language journals
British history journals